= Head of Hong Kong =

Head of Hong Kong may refer to:

- Governor of Hong Kong
- Chief Executive of Hong Kong
